John J. Ahn is a Korean-American scholar in Hebrew Bible.

Biography 
Ahn grew up in the boroughs of New York City. He received his BA from New York University, M.Div. from Princeton Theological Seminary, and, from Yale Divinity School, an STM and Ph.D. Pursuing his Ph.D. under Brevard Childs and Robert R. Wilson, and bringing together canonical and sociological methods, in December 2006 Ahn became the first Asian American or Korean American to complete a doctorate in the Old Testament from Yale University.

Ahn worked for five years as Senior Pastor of Northwest Baptist Church (Austin, TX) and taught at Austin Presbyterian Theological Seminary, before taking up a position teaching at Howard University, School of Divinity (Washington, DC), where he is presently an Associate Professor of Hebrew Bible. Ahn is also ordained in the Korean Presbyterian Church and also works as a Cooperative Youth Ministry Leader at Christ Congregational Church (Silver Spring, MD).

His scholarly work draws on sociological, literary, and theological approaches, and he has also worked on Korean American biblical hermeneutics.

As part of the Society of Biblical Literature's Mid-Atlantic region, Ahn was elected as the 2020-2021 Vice President and the 2021-2022 President.

Works

References 

Living people
American people of Korean descent
American biblical scholars
Old Testament scholars
New York University alumni
Princeton Theological Seminary alumni
Yale Divinity School alumni
Howard University faculty
Year of birth missing (living people)